Somewhere Between may refer to:

 Somewhere Between (album)
 Somewhere Between (TV series)